Óscar Rafael Valdez Fierro Jr. (born 22 December 1990) is a Mexican professional boxer. He is a former two weight world champion, holding the WBC super featherweight title from 2021 to 2022, and the WBO featherweight title from 2016 to 2019. Valdez qualified for the 2008 Olympics at the age of 17 and became the first Mexican Youth World Champion. Four years later, he qualified for the 2012 Summer Olympics. 

Valdez is known for his aggressive fighting style, punching power and combination punching. He holds a 77% knockout-to-win percentage.

Amateur career
At age 17, Valdez came to upset 2007 PanAm champion Carlos Cuadras at the semifinal of the 2007 National Championships and winning the bantamweight championship in his next bout.

At the Olympic qualifier he edged out Brazilian James Pereira in the semifinal and got one of two votes even though he lost in the final to Yankiel León, getting a silver medal and a pass to the Beijing Olympics with only 3 international bouts in his record.
In Beijing however, he ran right into eventual gold medal winner Enkhbatyn Badar-Uugan and lost his first bout 4–15.

In 2008, he moved up to Featherweight and won the first 2008 Youth World Amateur Boxing Championships. The tournament was held in Guadalajara in his home country, and he showed off the experience he had gained by beating his opponents from Barbados, Uzbekistan, Kazakhstan, Ukraine and Russia. In the semi-finals, he had also knocked out the opponent from Ukraine in the first round. In the finals, he dominated the opposition, such as Russian Maxim Dadashev, whom he beat 12–0 in the final.

In Milan, at the 2009 World Amateur Boxing Championships (seniors), he won the bronze medal and became the first Mexican to achieve a medal at a World Champhionships in the history of the sport in Mexico.

After his run through of the Featherweight division, once again Valdez moved back down to Bantamweight. There, he won his Olympic qualifier. Valdez won his first fight in the 2012 Olympic Games, defeating India's Shiva Thapa by a margin of 14–9. In his second fight of the games, he won to Tajikistan's Anvar Yunusov by a margin of 13–7 then lost 13–19 to Ireland's John Joe Nevin.

Professional boxing career

Early career 
On 28 August 2012, Valdez signed a long term contract with Espinoza Boxing, a well-known company, managed by Frank Espinoza. Valdez made his professional debut at the age of 21 on 3 November. He defeated Angel Prado via 2nd round stoppage in a scheduled six round fight. The fight took place at the Centro de Usos Multiples in Hermosillo, Sonora, Mexico. In December, Valdez knocked out Corben Page in round 2 at the Texas Station Casino in Las Vegas, Nevada. Both fights took place at featherweight.

In 2013, Valdez fought a total of six times at super featherweight, winning all the bouts inside the distance. By the end of the year, he racked up a record of 8 wins, all by stoppage and no defeats.

On 1 March 2014 Valdez fought Samuel Sanchez on the undercard of Lomachenko-Salido at the Alamodome in San Antonio, Texas. The fight was halted in round 3, as Valdez won via technical knockout. Valdez next fought in April on the Pacquiao-Bradley II undercard. He fought Adrian Perez (10–4–1, 1 KO) for the vacant NABF Junior super featherweight title in his first 8-round bout. The fight ended in round 4 when Valdez landed with a left hand to the liver, followed by a right hand, which sent Perez down to all fours. Perez made no attempt to get to his feet as the referee waved an end the bout. The three judges had Valdez ahead (30–27) at the time of stoppage. Valdez successfully defended the title in May at the Forum in Inglewood, California retiring Noel Echevarria (11–2, 6 KOs) after round 6.

Valdez returned to featherweight for the first time in nine fights on 26 July and went on to claim the vacant NABF Junior featherweight title in an 8-round unanimous decision victory against experienced journeyman Juan Ruiz (23–14, 7 KOs) at the Celebrity Theater in Phoenix, Arizona. All three judges equally scored the fight 80–71 in Valdez's favour. Ruiz was deducted 1 point for excessive holding during the fight. The fight significantly ended the successive knockout streak dating back to Valdez's fight in November 2012.

Valdez made a defence of the NABF Junior super featherweight title in the Alamadome in November against Mexican boxer Alberto Garza 26–8–1, 21 KOs). Valdez retained the title via a technical knockout in round 7. The fight marked Valdez's HBO debut. Valdez fought a further five times towards the end of 2014 through to December 2015. Notable boxers he defeated included former super bantamweight title challenger Chris Avalos, Jose Ramirez and former interim World featherweight title challenger Ruben Tamayo.

Featherweight

Valdez vs. Gradovich 
It was announced that Valdez would be fighting on the undercard of Pacquiao-Bradley III on 9 April 2016 for the vacant WBO NABO featherweight title against another prospect and former IBF featherweight champion Evgeny Gradovich (21–1–1, 9 KOs) at MGM Grand Garden Arena in Paradise, Nevada. Valdez defeated Gradovich via 4th round stoppage to claim the vacant title and move up in the WBO rankings. Valdez dominated from the opening bell with head and body combinations also appearing to have broken Gradovich's jaw. In round 4, Valdez caught Gradovich with a left hook which put him on the canvas. Referee Russell Mora started the count. Gradovich managed to get up, but Mora made the call to end the fight.

WBO featherweight champion

Valdez vs. Rueda 
On 23 July 2016, the undercard of Crawford-Postol at the MGM Grand Garden Arena, Valdez fought undefeated Argentine boxer Matias Rueda (26–0, 23 KOs). Two days prior to the fight, it was announced the fight would be for the WBO featherweight title after Vasyl Lomachenko decided to stay at super featherweight and vacate the featherweight title. Valdez claimed his first world title by winning the vacant WBO championship with a second-round stoppage win over Rueda, dropping him twice with body shots. After the second knockdown, referee Russell Mora waved the count for the TKO.

Valdez vs. Osawa, Marriaga 
Valdez made his first title defense against 31 year old Japanese boxer Hiroshige Osawa (30–3–4, 19 KOs) on the undercard of Pacquiao-Vargas PPV bout on 5 November 2016. Osawa was ranked #1 by the WBO. The fight took place at the Thomas & Mack Center in Paradise, Nevada. Valdez told FightNews.com of his excitement for his first title defence, “I am excited for this fight. I am looking at this fight like if I am the challenger and I want to keep that mentality to do my best and win the fight. I am ready for my first title defense but I am still training like I am trying to win that title.” The fight was one sided fight, Valdez halted Osawa in round 7 when he hurt him with a hook followed by a barrage of shots that prompted referee Vic Drakulich to stop the fight. Valdez hit accurate jabs and hard shots to the body and head from the opening bell and managed to knock down Osawa in round 4. At the time of stoppage, Valdez was ahead 60–53 on all three judges scorecards. According to Compubox, Valdez landed 191 punches to only 35 by Osawa, which included 129 power punches to his Osawa's 18.

On 17 February 2017 Top Rank announced that Valdez would be making a mandatory defence of his WBO featherweight title against former WBA 'Super' World featherweight title challenger Miguel Marriaga (25–1, 21 KOs) in the main event at the StubHub Center in Carson, California, on 22 April 2017. Marriaga knocked out Guy Robb in August 2016 to become the number one challenger. Bob Arum confirmed the undercard card would also include Gilberto Ramírez and Jessie Magdaleno defending their respective WBO titles and Olympic silver medalist Shakur Stevenson making his professional debut. In front of 5,419 fans, Valdez retained his WBO title in a slugfest, but was taken the 12 round distance for the first time in his professional career. It was also the first time in six fights going back to June 2015 that Valdez had a decision victory. The final judges scorecards were 119–108, 118–109 and 116–111. Many at ringside believed the wider scores did not do Marriaga any justice as it was a back and forth action fight. Marriaga was knocked down in round 10 after some strong middle rounds.

Valdez vs. Servania 
In July 2017, Top Rank set a return date of 22 September 2017 for Valdez to make a third defence of his WBO title. His manager Frank Espinoza confirmed that he was back in training. A venue in Tucson, Arizona was discussed. On 9 August, it was revealed that Valdez would fight unbeaten Filipino boxer Genesis Servania (29-0,12 KOs) in a voluntary defence at the Tucson Convention Center, with Gilberto Ramírez once again co-featuring. Valdez stated that he would like to unify the division and fight the winner of Leo Santa Cruz and Abner Mares, which was likely to take place in the fall of 2017.

In front of a crowd of 4,103, Valdez managed to recover from a knockdown and score a knockdown of his own, en route to retaining his WBO title via unanimous decision after 12 rounds. The three judges scored the fight 117-109, 116-110, 115-111 in favour of Valdez. Servania dropped Valdez in round 4 with a right hand to the head. Valdez recovered, but looked visibly hurt as he tried to shake it off. Servania was dropped following a big left hook the very next round. After round 6, the fight became one-sided. Servania struggled to let his hands go. After one punch, Valdez would grab Servania in a clinch. Valdez began to work the jab and throw power shots until the closing bell. In the post-fight interview, Valdez shrugged off the knockdown, “I never thought I was gonna be on the canvas like that. But this is boxing. To be completely honest, I wasn't really hurt. I was really surprised. I was like, ‘OK, I’m on the floor. But now, I’m gonna get up and I’m gonna do my work.” Valdez managed to land 192 of 697 punches (28%), he earned $400,000 for the fight, while Servania, who earned a $55,000 purse connected 120 of his 450 thrown (27%). Servania seemed upset with the wide scorecards, felt it was close and was open to fighting Valdez again. The whole averaged 706,000 viewers on ESPN.

Valdez vs. Quigg 
Top Rank stated they were planning to have Valdez back in action in February 2018, and hoped to have him fight three times during 2018. On 28 November 2017, according to RingTV, Valdez was to make his next defence on 10 March 2018 at the StubHub Center in Carson, California, headlining a Top Rank card on ESPN. On 3 January 2018, ESPN first reported that a deal was close to being reached for Valdez to defend his WBO featherweight title against British boxer Scott Quigg (34-1-2, 25 KOs). On 13 January, the fight was finalized. Valdez came in at 125.8 pounds at the weigh in for his fourth defence. Quigg however came in 3 pounds over at 128.8 pounds. He was not allowed to re-weigh. According to the California State Athletic Commission, if a fighter is 2 pounds or more over the contractual limit, he would not be allowed to lost the extra weight as he would have been 'dried out', any more weight loss could potentially be dangerous to their health. The CSAC fined Quigg 20% of his official purse of $100,000, with Valdez receiving half of the money from the fine. Quigg's purse was believed to be far more at around $500,000 plus British TV rights. Valdez was due his highest purse at $420,000, not including the additional $10,000 from Quigg's purse.

After a hard fought 12 round battle with saw Valdez break Quigg’s nose and in return Valdez have his own front teeth damaged, the final scorecards read 117-111, 117-111 and 118-110 in favour of the Valdez, thus retaining his WBO title. Quigg suffered a cut over his left eye in round 5 which caused him issues later in the fight whereas Valdez after having his mouth busted, was seen with blood pouring out in the second half of the fight. The difference in the fight was that Valdez had too much hand and foot speed for Quigg and was able unload on multiple punches on Quigg. Valdez's style of a higher punch output also caused him to take a lot of punishment throughout the fight. Valdez was hurt in round 5 from a big left hook from Quigg. In round 11, Valdez hurt Quigg with a hard head shot in the final 20 seconds. It was in round 11 that Quigg began to use his jab more to his own advantage. Valdez was then hurt by a low blow in that round. In round 12, Valdez tied Quigg up frequently and used movement to stay out of trouble. Quigg was humble in defeat stating the better man won, but felt it was closer. ESPN scored the fight for Valdez 115-113. They also reported that Quigg weighed 142.2 pounds compared to Valdez who was 135.6 pounds on fight night. CompuBox numbers showed that Valdez landed 238 of 914 punches thrown (26%), and Quigg landed 143 of his 595 thrown (24%). After the fight Quigg explained the reason he missed weight was because he had fractured his foot four weeks before the fight and unable to run to lose the extra pounds. Valdez visited oral surgeon Dr. Douglas Galen in Beverly Hills the following Monday and had his jaw wired shut. The card was watched by an average 1.1 million viewers on ESPN.

Valdez vs. Tommasone 
On 13 August 2018 it was announced Valdez had left longtime trainer Manny Robles and would instead return to training under Eddy Reynoso, well known for training Saul "Canelo" Álvarez. One of the main reasons for the change was for Valdez to tighten his defence after being involved in slugfests since winning the WBO title. On 1 November, it was reported that Valdez was looking to make a return to the ring at the Mexico City Arena on 12 January 2019. Later that month, a fight against 33 year old Spanish boxer Andoni Gago (20-3-3, 6 KOs) was finalized and would take place in Tucson, Arizona. At the time, Gago was ranked #14 with the WBO, making it an official title defence. Entering the fight, Gago was unbeaten in five fights, having lost to Lee Selby in March 2017. In December, it was reported the card would be scrapped and Valdez's return would be postponed. The reason behind this was because Gago was unable to secure a travel visa in time to make the trip to the United States. Some sources stated Valdez would instead return on the Alvarez-Kovalev rematch undercard. A day later it was announced that Valdez would next fight at The Ford Center at The Star in Frisco, Texas on 2 February 2019, with Italian boxer Carmine Tommasone (19-0, 5 KOs) as his opponent.

Valdez vs. Lopez 
On 30 November, 2019, Valdez fought Adam Lopez. Valdez won the fight via a seventh-round TKO.

Valdez vs. Velez 
In his next fight, Valdez fought Jayson Velez. Valdez had a great fight, dropping Velez three times before ending the fight via TKO in the tenth round.

WBC super featherweight champion

Valdez vs. Berchelt 

On 20 February 2021, Valdez faced Miguel Berchelt for the WBC super featherweight title. The fight had originally been scheduled for 12 December 2020, however it was postponed after Berchelt tested positive for COVID-19. Despite entering the bout as the sizable betting underdog, Valdez won the bout via tenth-round knockout to become a two-division world champion.

Valdez vs. Conceição 
Valdez made his first defense of his WBC super featherweight title against the 2016 Olympic Gold medalist Robson Conceição on September 10, 2021, at the Casino Del Sol in Tucson, Arizona, United States. On August 31, it was revealed that Valdez had tested positive for the banned stimulant phentermine. On September 2, his B-sample tested positive as well. The fight with Conceição would still happen however, as the Pascua Yaqui Tribe Athletic Commission went by WADA guidelines, which only prohibit stimulants in-competition. Valdez won the closely contested fight by unanimous decision, with two judges awarding him a 115-112 scorecard, while the third judge scored it 117-110 for Valdez. Conceição had a better start to the fight, although he began to tire around the mid-rounds, after which Valdez began to take over. A number of fans and fighters disagreed with the scorecards, with Sunny Edwards stating "So you let him cheat with drugs, then gift him the scorecards", while Tony Harrison wrote "I don’t think Valdez won but that’s me on to the next". However, most media members scored the fight for Valdez.

Valdez vs. Stevenson 
On January 16, 2022, rumors surfaced that Valdez would face the WBO junior lightweight champion Shakur Stevenson in a title unification bout on April 30, 2022, at the MGM Grand Garden Arena in Paradise, Nevada. Promoter Bob Arum revealed three days later that Valdez and Stevenson had come to terms to meet in a super-featherweight world title unification fight. The fight is expected to take place on April 30, at the MGM Grand Garden Arena in Paradise, Nevada. Valdez lost the fight by unanimous decision, with scores of 117–110, 118–109, and 118–109. The fight drew in an average of 1,353,000 viewers on ESPN and peaked at 1,440,000.

Post title reign

Valdez vs. Navarrete 
On November 9, 2022, Valdez was ordered by the WBO to face the sanctioning body's reigning featherweight beltholder Emanuel Navarrete for the vacant WBO junior lightweight championship. The title bout was booked to take place on February 3, 2023, and headlined an ESPN broadcast card, which was expected to take place at the Desert Diamond Arena in Glendale, Arizona, on February 3, 2023. Valdez withdrew from the fight on December 13, with an undisclosed injury. Navarrete was re-scheduled to face Liam Wilson, with the winner of the bout then expected to face Valdez.

Professional boxing record

See also
List of world featherweight boxing champions
List of world super-featherweight boxing champions
List of Mexican boxing world champions

References

External links
 
 Photo, Spanish article
 Qualifier
Junior World Championships 2008 results
Excerpts from his fights and Spanish interview Youtube
Oscar Valdez - Profile, News Archive & Current Rankings at Box.Live

|-

1990 births
Living people
Mexican male boxers
Boxers from Sonora
Olympic boxers of Mexico
People from Nogales, Sonora
Boxers at the 2008 Summer Olympics
Boxers at the 2012 Summer Olympics
Boxers at the 2011 Pan American Games
AIBA World Boxing Championships medalists
Pan American Games silver medalists for Mexico
Pan American Games medalists in boxing
Central American and Caribbean Games gold medalists for Mexico
Competitors at the 2010 Central American and Caribbean Games
Central American and Caribbean Games medalists in boxing
Medalists at the 2011 Pan American Games
Bantamweight boxers
Featherweight boxers
Super-featherweight boxers
World featherweight boxing champions
World super-featherweight boxing champions
World Boxing Organization champions
World Boxing Council champions
21st-century Mexican people